Giolla na Naomh Mág Samhradháin, the First, was chief of the McGovern Clan and Baron or Lord of Tullyhaw barony, County Cavan from c.1148 - 1181.

Ancestry

His ancestry was Giolla na Naomh son of Muireadhach Mág Samhradhán who was the son of Samhradhán mac Conchobhar mac Fearghal mac Flann mac Aonghus mac Conchobhar mac Tadhg Tir mac Ruarc mac Íomhaor mac Cosgrach mac Dúnghal mac Oireachtach mac Eochaidh (Teallach n-Eachach or Tullyhaw is named after the latter)

Family

His son was Giolla Íosa Mág Samhradháin who was chief of the clan from c.1181 – 1231

References

Irish lords
People from County Cavan
12th-century Irish people